Radziwiłłów is a Polish toponym referring to the Radziwiłł noble family. It may refer to:

 Radziwiłłów, Greater Poland Voivodeship, village in Greater Poland Voivodeship
 Radziwiłłów, Masovian Voivodeship, village in Masovian Voivodeship
 Radyvyliv, town in Ukraine (formerly in Poland)